Averham is a civil parish in the Newark and Sherwood district of Nottinghamshire, England.  The parish contains seven listed buildings that are recorded in the National Heritage List for England.  Of these, one is listed at Grade I, the highest of the three grades, one is at Grade II*, the middle grade, and the others are at Grade II, the lowest grade.  The parish contains the village of Averham and the surrounding countryside, and the listed buildings consist of houses, and a church and its lychgate.


Key

Buildings

References

Citations

Sources

 

Lists of listed buildings in Nottinghamshire